Fredrik Samuelsson (born 16 February 1995) is a Swedish decathlete. He represented his country at the 2017 World Championships dropping out after three events. His biggest success to date is the silver medal at the 2017 European U23 Championships.

International competitions

Personal bests

Outdoor
100 metres – 10.81 (+1.4 m/s, Götzis 2017)
400 metres – 48.99 (Bydgoszcz 2017)
1500 metres – 4:33.99 (Götzis 2019)
110 metres hurdles – 14.10 (+1.4 m/s, Götzis 2017)
High jump – 2.08 (Berlin 2017)
Pole vault – 5.00 (Götzis 2017)
Long jump – 7.81 (+0.8 m/s, Tallinn 2015)
Shot put – 14.93 (Falun 2019)
Discus throw – 45.19 (Götzis 2019)
Javelin throw – 59.33 (Götzis 2018)
Decathlon – 8172 (Götzis 2017)

Indoor
60 metres – 7.05 (Sätra 2019)
1000 metres – 2:42.97 (Belgrade 2017)
60 metres hurdles – 8.07 (Sätra 2018)
High jump – 2.08 (Norrköping 2018)
Pole vault – 5.00 (Belgrade 2017)
Long jump – 7.66 (Glasgow 2019)
Shot put – 14.69 (Glasgow 2019)
Heptathlon – 6125 (Glasgow 2019)

References

External links
Official website

1995 births
Living people
Swedish decathletes
World Athletics Championships athletes for Sweden
Swedish Athletics Championships winners
21st-century Swedish people